Ahmet Rona Serozan (15 June 1942 – 6 November 2018) was a Turkish jurist, university professor of civil law, lawyer and writer.

Early life
Ahmet Rona Serozan was born to Sami and Maide Serozan in a wealthy family in Istanbul, Turkey on 15 June 1942. His father was a textile engineer and interpreneur in yarn manufacturing. He had a brother, Engin Serozan.

He graduated from Faculty of Law at Istanbul University in 1964. He then went to West Germany, where he earned a Ph.D. degree magna cum laude
at Tübingen University Faculty of Law in 1967. His doctoral thesis on "Die Überwindung der Rechtsfolgen des Formmangels im Rechtsgeschäft nach deutschem, schweizerischem und türkischem Recht" ("Overcoming the legal consequences of the lack of form in legal transactions under German, Swiss and Turkish law") was published as a book by Mohr Siebeck Verlag in Germany the next year.

Career
In April 1974, he became associate professor at Istanbul University with a habilitation thesis on "Sözleşmeden Dönme" ("Breach of contract"). After his application for full professorship at the same university did not succeed due to a formality, he worked as a lawyer between 1982 and 1988. With the decision of Council of State, he was appointed full professor of civil law at Istanbul University in 1991.
 Serozan retired drom his post at Istanbul University in June 2009, and took a full professor post at Istanbul Bilgi University serving there until his death.

Serozan authored many textbooks in the field of civil law and translated books on Fascism, Capitalism and State law from German language.

Death
Rona Serozan died at the age of 76 in Istanbul on 6 November 2018. He was buried following a memorial ceremony held at Istanbul University's Faculty of Law and the religious funeral at Bebek Mosque.

Works

References

2018 deaths
Lawyers from Istanbul
Writers from Istanbul
Istanbul University Faculty of Law alumni
University of Tübingen alumni
Academic staff of Istanbul University
Academic staff of Istanbul Bilgi University
20th-century Turkish lawyers
Turkish male writers
Turkish legal writers
1942 births